The 22nd Vietnam Film Festival was held from November 18 to November 20, 2021, in Huế City, Thừa Thiên Huế Province, Vietnam, with the slogan "Building a Vietnamese film industry rich in national identity, modern and humane" (Vietnamese: "Xây dựng nền công nghiệp điện ảnh Việt Nam giàu bản sắc dân tộc, hiện đại và nhân văn"). It was originally scheduled to be held in September 2021 but had to be moved to November due to the impact of the COVID-19 pandemic.

Event 
The 22nd Vietnam Film Festival is a national art and culture event to celebrate the country's major holidays in 2021, especially implementing the Resolution of the 13th Party Congress. This is also an opportunity for artists and filmmakers to continue implementing the approved project to build and promote the national brand of the Vietnam Film Festival in the 2021-2030 period.

This year, for the first time, the festival has two more awards besides the usual award system: Best First Film Director and Best Visual Effects.

In the end, 4 Golden Lotus award were given to films in categories: feature film, documentary film, science film and animated film.

Participation 
Films for the contest include feature films, documentaries, animated films, and science films, licensed for distribution from September 11, 2019, to August 10, 2021. Films participating in the festival must be Vietnamese-language films, produced by Vietnamese film establishments or in cooperation with foreign organizations and individuals, without copyright disputes.

In addition, films participating in this festival must be works that have not yet attended the 21st Vietnam Film Festival and the National Television Festival, and do not violate the Intellectual Property Law and related regulations. Remake films (based on scripts, foreign films) can register to attend the festival's programs. In case the film is selected for the contest round, individual awards for director, actor, painter, cinematographer, sound and music will be considered.

The organizers do not award awards to remake movies and screenplay writers. The last date to receive applications to attend the Festival is August 15. The last date to receive the film is September 20.

From 141 films submitted for participation, the Organizing Committee selected 128 films from 48 units, including: 26 feature films, 56 documentaries, 15 scientific films, and 31 animated films. In which, 17 feature films, 37 documentaries, 15 scientific films, 23 animated films will participate in the Competition Program, the rest will be under the Panorama Program.

Juries 
The jury panels of the 21st Vietnam Film Festival were announced on November 18.

The Feature Film jury consists of 9 members:
 Director Nguyễn Vinh Sơn (Head)
 Composer Đỗ Trường An
 Director, Cinematographer Phạm Việt Thanh
 Director Lương Đình Dũng
 Screenwriter, Producer Nguyễn Thị Hồng Ngát
 Actress, Producer Trương Ngọc Ánh
 Director Lý Minh Thắng
 Art Designer Phạm Quốc Trung
 Journalist Trần Hữu Việt

The Documentary & Science Film jury consists of 7 members:
 Director Lê Hồng Chương (Head)

The Animated Film jury consists of 5 members:
 Director, Animator Nguyễn Thị Phương Hoa (Head)
 Composer Giáng Son

Activities 
Due to the impact of the COVID-19 epidemic, although there are still some activities held in person, most of the programs to interact with the audience and show introductory films within the framework of the film festival are in online form.

Feature films participating in the film festival that are screened in the program "Welcome to the 22nd Vietnam Film Festival" will be broadcast on the digital platform VTVGo (for movies that are allowed to be shown online) from November 10 to November 16.

From November 14 to 20, Huế audiences can watch movies, with the condition that they comply with the 5K distancing regulations, at 4 cinemas as follows:
Đông Ba cinema (187 Trần Hưng Đạo street)
BHD Cineplex (Vincom Plaza, 50A Hùng Vương street)
Cine Star (25 Hai Bà Trưng street)
Lotte Cinema (4th floor, BigC Huế Building, 181 Bà Triệu street)
The films were also broadcast on the digital platform VTVGo (for movies that are allowed to be shown online).

The opening and closing ceremonies of this year's film festival were shortened. The opening and press conference ceremony was incorporated in the press conference, taking place at Silk Path Hotel, Huế city and 9 am on November 18, 2021. The announcement and award ceremony of the Film Festival took place at Song Huong Theater, inside the Huế Academy of Music, and was broadcast live at 20:10 on November 20, 2021 on VTV1 channel Vietnam Television, Thừa Thiên-Huế Radio and Television Station and on VTVGo platform.

The festival also includes many side programs:
Exhibition "Thua Thien-Hue - Destination of filmmakers" (Vietnamese: "Thừa Thiên-Huế - Điểm đến của các nhà làm phim"), hosted by the Vietnam Film Institute
Exhibition "The Heritage and You" (Vietnamese: "Di sản và Bạn"), hosted by the Department of Tourism of Thừa Thiên-Huế province, held both offline and online, at Huế Academy of Music and Điềm Phùng Thị Art Space
Ao dai show "Ao Dai with Cinema" took place on the evening of November 18 in the campus of Huế Academy of Music
The tour "Discover the film set in Hue with the five-body ao dai" (Vietnamese: "Khám phá bối cảnh phim trường ở Huế cùng áo dài ngũ thân")

Official Selection

Feature film

In Competition 

Highlighted title indicates Golden Lotus winner.

Panorama Program 
There were 9 films officially selected for this program but later, 2 of them withdrew. Award for the most favorite film voted by the audience was not presented this year.

Awards

Feature film

Documentary/Science film

Documentary film

Science film

Animated film

Notes

References 

Vietnam Film Festival
Vietnam Film Festival
Vietnam Film Festival
2021 in Vietnam
November 2021 events in Vietnam